This is a  list of television channels on Guam.

List

References 

Guam
Guam